Steen Bostrup (January 24, 1939 in Horsens - September 6, 2006 in Copenhagen) was a Danish newscaster and journalist on TV Avisen for the Danish Broadcasting Corporation from 1964 to 2001.

Biography 
Steen Bostrup was born in January 24, 1939 in Horsens. He started his career as a journalist at Horsens Folkeblad in 1959, and soon after, he joined a local newspaper. In 1964, Bostrup got his first job at Danmarks Radio as a freelancer journalist. In 1996, he received a DR's Sprogpris award. He also was appointed a Knight of the Order of the Dannebrog in 1999. He died of a cardiac arrest on September 6, 2006.

References

1939 births
2006 deaths
20th-century Danish journalists